Wilberforce Eaves and Ernest Lewis defeated Walter Bailey and Charles Simond 6–4, 6–4, 6–3 in the All Comers' Final, but the reigning champions Herbert Baddeley and Wilfred Baddeley defeated Eaves and Lewis 8–6, 5–7, 6–4, 6–3 in the challenge round to win the gentlemen's doubles tennis title at the 1895 Wimbledon Championships.

Draw

Challenge round

All Comers'

References

External links

Gentlemen's Doubles
Wimbledon Championship by year – Men's doubles